The 2023 World Rugby Under 20 Championship will be the thirteenth edition of the premier age-grade rugby competition. The tournament is to be in South Africa for the second time, previously being held in 2012.

Venues

Pool stage
The pool stage fixture was to have been as follows:

Pool A
{| class="wikitable" style="text-align: center;"
|-
!width="200"|Team
!width="20"|Pld
!width="20"|W
!width="20"|D
!width="20"|L
!width="20"|PF
!width="20"|PA
!width="32"|−/+
!width="20"|TF
!width="20"|TA
!width="20"|BP
!width="20"|Pts
|- 
|align=left| 
| 0 || 0 || 0 || 0 || 0 || 0 || 0 || 0 ||  0 || 0 || 0
|- 
|align=left| 
| 0 || 0 || 0 || 0 || 0 || 0 || 0 || 0 ||  0 || 0 || 0
|-   
|align=left| 
| 0 || 0 || 0 || 0 || 0 || 0 || 0 || 0 ||  0 || 0 || 0
|-  
|align=left| 
| 0 || 0 || 0 || 0 || 0 || 0 || 0 || 0 ||  0 || 0 || 0
|}

Pool B
{| class="wikitable" style="text-align: center;"
|-
!width="200"|Team
!width="20"|Pld
!width="20"|W
!width="20"|D
!width="20"|L
!width="20"|PF
!width="20"|PA
!width="32"|−/+
!width="20"|TF
!width="20"|TA
!width="20"|BP
!width="20"|Pts
|- 
| align="left" | 
| 0 || 0 || 0 || 0 || 0 || 0 || 0 || 0 || 0 || 0 ||0
|-  
| align="left" | 
| 0 || 0 || 0 || 0 || 0 || 0 || 0 || 0 || 0 || 0 ||0
|-
| align="left" | 
| 0 || 0 || 0 || 0 || 0 || 0 || 0 || 0 || 0 || 0 ||0
|-  
| align="left" | 
| 0 || 0 || 0 || 0 || 0 || 0 || 0 || 0 || 0 || 0 ||0
|}

Pool C
{| class="wikitable" style="text-align: center;"
|-
!width="200"|Team
!width="20"|Pld
!width="20"|W
!width="20"|D
!width="20"|L
!width="20"|PF
!width="20"|PA
!width="32"|−/+
!width="20"|TF
!width="20"|TA
!width="20"|BP
!width="20"|Pts
|- 
|align=left| 
| 0 || 0 || 0 || 0 || 0 || 0 || 0 || 0 || 0 || 0 ||0
|-  
|align=left| 
| 0 || 0 || 0 || 0 || 0 || 0 || 0 || 0 || 0 || 0 ||0
|- style=
|align=left| 
| 0 || 0 || 0 || 0 || 0 || 0 || 0 || 0 || 0 || 0 ||0
|-  
|align=left| 
| 0 || 0 || 0 || 0 || 0 || 0 || 0 || 0 || 0 || 0 ||0
|}

References

World Rugby Under 20 Championship
World Rugby Under 20 Championship
World Rugby Under 20 Championship
World Rugby Under 20 Championship